In Jainism, Ambika ("Mother") or Ambika Devi (  "the Goddess-Mother") is the  "dedicated attendant deity" or  "protector goddess" of the 22nd Tirthankara, Neminatha. She is also known as Ambai, Amba, Kushmandini and Amra Kushmandini. She is often shown with one or more children and often under a tree.  She is frequently represented as a pair (Yaksha Sarvanubhuti on the right and Kushmandini on the left) with a small Tirthankar image on the top. The name ambika literally means mother, hence she is Mother Goddess. The name is also a common epithet of Hindu Goddess Parvati.

Etymology 
The name Ambika is a Sanskrit words, that translates to mother.

Jain Biography

Early life 
According to Jain text, Ambika is said to have been an ordinary woman named Agnila who became a Goddess. She lived in the city of Girinagar with her husband, Soma as per Śhvētāmbara tradition and Somasarman as per Digambara tradition and her two children, Siddha and Budda as per Śhvētāmbara tradition and Shubhanakar and Prabhankara as per Digambara tradition.

Offering to Varadatta 
One day, Somasarman invited Brahmins to perform Śrāddha (funeral ceremony) and left Agnila at home. Varadatta, the chief disciple of Neminatha, was passing by and asked for food from Agnila to end his month-long fast. Somasarman and Brahmins were furious at her as they considered the food to be impure now. Somasarman drove her out of the house along with her children; she went up to a hill.

Rebirth as Goddess 
She was blessed with power for her virtue, the tree she sat down under became a Kalpavriksha, wish-granting tree, and dry water tank has overflown with water. Gods were angry at the treatment with Angila and decided to drown everything in her village but her house. After seeing this Somasarman and Brahmins felt this was because of saintliness and went to beg for her forgiveness. Upon looking at her husband afraid of punishment Angila committed suicide by jumping off the cliff but was instantly reborn as Goddess Ambika. Her husband was reborn as a lion and he came to her, licked her feet and became her vehicle.  Neminatha initiated her two sons and Ambika became Neminath's yakshi.

Legacy 
Ambika is the yakshi of Neminatha with Sarvanha (according to Digambara tradition) or Gomedha (according to Śvētāmbara tradition) as yaksha .

Worship 

Worship of Ambika is very old, a number of images and temples of ambika are found in India. Goddess Ambika along with Padmavati, Chakreshvari are held as esteemed deities and worshipped in Jains along with tirthankaras. Ambika and Padmavati are associated with tantric rituals. These tantric rites involves yantra-vidhi, pitha-sthapana and mantra-puja. Ambika is also called Kalpalata and kamana devi a goddess that fulfils. In Vimal Vasai Ambika is carved kalpalata, a wish fulfilling creeper.
Ambika is also associated with childbirth and prosperity. Ambika and Sarvahana is the most favoured yaksha-yakshi pair in western parts of India. Ambika is also worshiped as Kuladevi or gotra-devi. Ambika is the kula-devi of the Porwad(Pragvat) Jain community. While she is worshipped by all murtipujak Jains, she is specially revered by the Porwads.

According to legend, after completing construction of Gommateshwara statue, Chavundaraya organised a mahamastakabhisheka with five liquids, milk, tender coconut, sugar, nectar and water collected in hundreds of pots but liquid could not flow below the navel of the statue. Kushmandini appeared disguised as a poor old woman holding milk in the shell of half of a white Gullikayi fruit and the abhisheka was done from head to toe. Chavundaraya realised his mistake and did abhishek without pride and arrogance and this time abhisheka was done from head to toe. Worship of Kushmandini devi or Ambika is an integral part of Jain rituals in Shravanabelagola.

In literature 
 Ambika-Kalpa, Ambika-Tadamka, Ambikatatanka, Ambika-stuti, Ambika-devi-stuti and Bhairava-Padmavati-Kalpa are tantric text to worship Ambika.
 Ambika-stavana, is hymn to Ambika, compiled by Vastupala, minister of Chalukyas, in 13th century.
 Ambika-devi-kalpa of Acharya Jinprabha suri, 14th century.
 Aparajita-prccha is hymn to Ambika, compiled by Bhuvanadeva, 12th-13th century.

Iconography 

According to the tradition, her colour is golden and her vehicle is a lion. She has four arms. In her two right hands, she carries a mango and in the other a branch of a mango tree. In one of her left hands, she carries a rein and in the other she has her two sons, Priyankara and Shubhankara. In South India Ambika is shown to have dark blue complexion. Ambika is depicted as sashandevi for other tirthankars as well. Ambika is often represent with Bahubali. Yaksha-Yakshi pair sculptures of Ambika and Sarvahanabhuti are one of the most favoured along with Gomukha-Chakreshwari and Dharanendra-Padmavati.

Ambika has been popular an independent deity as well. It is speculated that the origin of Ambika is attributed to elements of three different deities - first, goddess riding on the lion from Durga; Second, some goddess associated with mangoes and mango trees; Third, Kushmanda.

The Amba-Ambika group of caves of Manmodi Caves, dated 2nd century CE, has carving of Goddess Ambika. The oldest sculpture of Ambika is an idol from Akota Bronzes dated 550—600 CE. A sculpture of Ambika was discovered at Karajagi village in Haveri taluk. The sculpture has a two-line Sanskrit inscription in Nagari script about the date of its installation - "Ambikadevi, Shaka 1173, Virodhikrit. Samvatsara, Vaishakha Shuddha 5, Guruvara". This corresponds to Thursday, 27 April 1251 AD.

Main temples 

The Amba-Ambika group of caves of Manmodi Caves, dated 2nd century CE, is dedicated to Goddess Ambika. The Ambika temple, Girnar dates back 784 CE and is considered one of the oldest temple dedicated to Goddess Ambika. The worship of Goddess Ambika, the tutelary deity of Shri Munisuvrata-Nemi-Parshva Jinalaya, Santhu is popular among devotees. 

The major temples of Shri Ambika Devi include:

 Ambikadevi temple at Kodinar, Saurashtra in the state of Gujarat is an important pilgramge center built in pre-medieval period.
 Shri Kuladevi Ambikadevi Jain Temple, Takhatgarh in Pali district of Rajasthan state.
 Shri Kuladevi Ambikadevi Jain Temple, Padarli, Rajasthan.

See also 

 Padmavati
 Chakreshvari

References

Citation

Sources

Books

Web

External links
 An Image of Yaksha & Yakshini of 22nd Trithankara Neminatha
 An Image of Shri Ambikadevi, Munigiri, Tamil Nadu
 A Picture of Shri Ambikadevi, Jain Thirthankaras & Acharyas
 An Image of Shri Ambikadevi in Chennai Museum

Mother goddesses
Heavenly attendants in Jainism
Neminatha